Mesasippus is a genus of grasshoppers in the tribe Gomphocerini, erected by Yu S, Tarbinsky in 1931.  Species have been recorded from eastern Europe through to central China.

Species 
The Orthoptera Species File lists:
 Mesasippus ammophilus Bey-Bienko, 1948
 Mesasippus arenosus (Bey-Bienko, 1930) (2 subspecies)
 Mesasippus barsukiensis Mistshenko, 1951
 Mesasippus divergens (Bey-Bienko, 1930)
 Mesasippus fuscovittatus (Tarbinsky, 1927)
 Mesasippus geophilus (Bey-Bienko, 1930)
 Mesasippus kozhevnikovi (Tarbinsky, 1925) - type species (as Chorthippus kozhevnikovi Tarbinsky = M. kozhevnikovi kozhevnikovi, the nominate subspecies out of 3)
 Mesasippus nudus (Umnov, 1931)
 Mesasippus scitus Mistshenko, 1951
 Mesasippus tarbagataicus Sergeev & Bugrov, 1988

References

External links

Orthoptera genera
Orthoptera of Asia
Orthoptera of Europe
Gomphocerinae